Numbor Rural LLG is a local-level government (LLG) of East Sepik Province, Papua New Guinea.

Wards
01. Kininien
02. Harua
03. Wamaian
04. Sasenumbohu
05. Niakandogum
06. Neimo
07. Niagombi
08. Mushuagen
09. Waremba
10. Nimbogu
11. Abawia
12. Hambuke
13. Hanyak
14. Numindogum
15. Nangumarum
16. Tangori 1
17. Sasoya
18. Tangori 2
19. Papieng
20. Huaripmogum
21. Nungori
22. Para
23. Paparom

References

Local-level governments of East Sepik Province